Isabelle Joschke is an offshore sailor of dual nationality of German and French she was born on 27 January 1977 in Munich, Germany.

Personal life
She was born in Munich on 27 January 1977 and has German father and a French mother and therefore has dual nationality. Her childhood was spent in both Geneva and Paris. She discovered sailing at the age of five, sailing an Optimist on a family holiday on the lakes of Austria. Fifteen years later, she did an internship in the Glénans, which definitely communicated her taste for the wide.

She has a master's degree in classical literature at the Sorbonne.

Sailing career

2004–2007 Mini Class

2008–2015 Bénéteau Figaro

2016–2017 Class 40

2017–present IMOCA 60
She competed in the 2020–2021 Vendée Globe IMOCA 60 onboard MACSF. She had to retire from the race while approaching cape horn due to keel RAM failure.

References

External links
 Official Website 

 

1977 births
Living people
Sportspeople from Munich
French female sailors (sport)
German female sailors (sport)
IMOCA 60 class sailors
Class 40 class sailors
German Vendee Globe sailors
French Vendee Globe sailors
2020 Vendee Globe sailors